Ulivellia inversa is a species of ulidiid or picture-winged fly in the genus Ulivellia of the family Ulidiidae.

References

Ulidiidae